Alberto Tomba (born 19 December 1966 in San Lazzaro di Savena) is a former World Cup alpine ski racer from Italy. He was the dominant technical skier (slalom and giant slalom) in the late 1980s and 1990s. At 182 cm and 90 kg, his powerful build was a contrast to the lighter, more traditional technical skiers who prioritised agility over muscle. Tomba was able to take advantage of the introduction of spring-loaded ski gates which replaced the older, solid gates in the early 1980s by using his power to maintain a faster, more direct line through courses. Tomba won three Olympic gold medals, two World Championships, and nine World Cup season titles: four in slalom, four in giant slalom, and one overall title.  He was popularly called Tomba la Bomba ("Tomba the Bomb").

Early years
Alberto Tomba was born in Bologna and raised in Castel de Britti, a village in the municipality of San Lazzaro di Savena – an area without strong alpine traditions, but not far from the appenninic piste of Monte Cimone and Corno alle Scale. His father Franco, a businessman in the textile industry, had been a keen skier since attending college in Switzerland and passed his love of the sport to his sons, driving Alberto and his older brother Marco from their home to Sestola so they could ski. Alberto learned to ski at the age of three and started racing at the age of seven. As a child, he participated in sports like tennis, football, and dirt biking, but he found that his greatest passion was for skiing. Later in life, in 1988, his father Franco promised him a Ferrari if he won a gold medal that year and, as he celebrated his first gold at the bottom of the slope, Alberto told his father and everyone else who was watching on TV that he wanted the car to be red.

In 1984 he took part in the Junior World Championships, where a fourth-place finish won him a position on the national B team. That year, in an exhibition parallel slalom competition in San Siro, Milan, he surprised everyone by beating every member of the A team. After three wins on the Europa Cup circuit, Tomba made his World Cup debut in December 1985 at Madonna di Campiglio, Italy, three days before his nineteenth birthday. Two months later, in Åre, Sweden, he surprised the skiing world by finishing sixth from a bib number of 62. His first podium came the following season in Alta Badia, Italy in December 1986, and later that winter he won bronze in the giant slalom at the 1987 World Championships in Crans-Montana, Switzerland - the only medal won by the Italian team at that World Championships.

Rise to fame
On 27 November 1987, Tomba scored his first World Cup victory, in a slalom at Sestriere, Italy (with starting bib number 25). Two days later he won the giant slalom, beating his idol, Ingemar Stenmark. It was now clear that Tomba was a force to be reckoned with within the alpine skiing world.

He went on to win nine races that 1988 season, including a slalom win at Madonna di Campiglio where he beat the second-placed finisher by 1.34 seconds, shouting "I am the new messiah of skiing!" as he crossed the finish line. He won that year's World Cup titles in both slalom and giant slalom, but was runner-up in the overall standings to Pirmin Zurbriggen of Switzerland. During this early part of his career, Tomba also competed in super G, an event he would continue to contest until 1989, despite never finishing better than fourth.

At the 1988 Winter Olympics in Calgary, Tomba won gold medals in slalom and giant slalom. In the first run of the GS, he finished an impressive 1.14 seconds ahead of his nearest competitor. "Tomba la Bomba" ("Tomba the Bomb"), as he was known, also earned some notoriety by asking out East German figure skater Katarina Witt, whom he met again later on.

Tomba was not as successful in the following two seasons, winning a total of four World Cup races. At the 1989 World Championships in Vail, Colorado, he could do no better than sixth place in the super G and seventh in the giant slalom. From 1989 to the end of his career, Tomba was surrounded by his own technical staff managed by former Olympic champion Gustav Thöni and strength and conditioning coach Giorgio d'Urbano, who worked with him for ten seasons.

Tomba was temporarily put out of action in 1990 when he crashed in a World Cup race in Val-d'Isère, breaking his collarbone. However, in the 1991 season, Tomba returned to his winning ways, winning the giant slalom World Cup title for a second time while finishing fourth in the slalom standings. He ended 4th in slalom at the 1991 World Championships at Saalbach-Hinterglemm (Austria) and crashed in the second giant slalom run after having clocked the fastest time in the first leg, handing the victory to Austria's Rudolf Nierlich, the two-time winner at Vail, Colorado, two years earlier. In September 1991, he also met former Miss Italy, Martina Colombari, whom he dated for several years.

Tomba's career reached its second peak during the 1992 season with nine victories and fifteen podiums, and he once again captured the season-long discipline titles in both his technical specialties. His duel with Paul Accola for the overall World Cup crown extended until the very end of the season and the Finals at Crans-Montana, but the Swiss skier scoring points in all disciplines including downhill and combined ultimately prevailed. At the 1992 Winter Olympics in Albertville, France, Tomba won what was to be his last gold medal at Val d'Isère, in the giant slalom, and picked up a silver in the slalom. In Val d'Isère, he became the first alpine champion to successfully defend an Olympic title when he won the giant slalom ahead of Marc Girardelli.

The 1993 World Championships, held in Morioka, Japan, again proved to be his nemesis. Tomba was suffering from a fever during the giant slalom and made a critical mistake in the slalom, failing to reach the podium in either race. To make matters worse, he only managed to win a single World Cup race in the entire 1993 season.

Overall World Cup champion

Tomba was back to his usual ways at the 1994 Winter Olympics in Lillehammer, Norway. After his slalom run, he was seemingly out of medal contention, (placed 12th) 1.84 seconds behind leader Thomas Stangassinger (and 1.00 behind place 3, Peter Roth), but in the second run he recovered to second place and won the silver medal.

It soon became apparent that the 1995 World Cup season would be his best yet. From December 1994 to March 1995, he amassed an impressive 11 victories in the technical events including seven in a row in slalom to finally capture the overall World Cup title that had eluded him in years past and bringing the Crystal Globe back to Italy, twenty years after Gustav Thöni's last title in 1975.

At the 1996 World Championships, Tomba finally added the final missing pieces to his trophy case, winning two gold medals at Sierra Nevada, Spain. His GS victory came thanks to a second-run rally from 0.81 seconds behind.

After the 1996 World Championships, Tomba began contemplating retirement. He decided to come back for one more World Championship, held in 1997 on his home snow in Sestriere. He was disqualified in the giant slalom and had a disappointing first run in the slalom, but an excellent second run was good enough for his last major medal, a bronze. He decided to continue competing for one more year.

Tomba's performance at the 1998 Winter Olympics in Nagano was a sign that his career was winding to a close: for the first time in his Olympic career, he failed to medal after crashing in giant slalom. He suffered a painful injury and was not able to start in the second slalom run after losing much time in the first leg.

Alberto Tomba retired at the end of the 1998 season, but not before winning a last World Cup race at the Finals at Crans-Montana where he grabbed the slalom, becoming the only alpine male skier to have won at least one World Cup race per year for 11 consecutive seasons.

Later in life
After retiring from competitions, Tomba made numerous appearances on Italian television broadcasts, and in 2000 he made his acting debut in the crime film Alex l'ariete, directed by Damiano Damiani; the movie, however, was met with little success and was unanimously panned by movie critics.

At the 2006 Winter Olympics Opening Ceremony in Turin, Tomba brought the Olympic Flame into the stadium where he handed it off to the men's 4 × 10 km gold medalists from the 1994 Winter Olympics in Lillehammer (De Zolt, Albarello, Vanzetta, Fauner). During the 2010 edition of "Sport Movies & TV - Milano International FICTS Fest" he was awarded with "Excellence Guirlande D'Honneur" and entered in the FICTS "Hall of Fame".

Medals

Winter Olympic Games
 1988: gold in giant slalom, gold in slalom at Calgary, Alberta, Canada (Nakiska).
 1992: gold in giant slalom, silver in slalom at Albertville, France (Val d'Isère).
 1994: silver in slalom at Lillehammer, Norway (Hafjell).

Alpine World Ski championships
 1987: bronze in giant slalom at Crans Montana, Switzerland.
 1996: gold in giant slalom, gold in slalom at Sierra Nevada, Spain.
 1997: bronze in slalom at Sestriere, Italy

Alpine skiing World Cup
 50 victories (35 in slalom, 15 in giant slalom), including seven consecutive slalom wins in the 1995 season.
 28-second-place finishes
 11 third-place finishes

World Cup results

Season standings

Season titles
 9 titles (1 overall, 4 giant slalom, 4 slalom)

Race victories
 50 wins (15 GS, 35 SL)
 88 podiums (31 GS, 57 SL)

Olympics results

World Championships results

See also
 Ski World Cup Most podiums & Top 10 results
 Italy at the Olympics – Men gold medalist
 Italian skiers most successful race winner

References

External links
 
 
 
  
 Alberto Tomba's career (victory by victory)

1966 births
Alpine skiers at the 1988 Winter Olympics
Alpine skiers at the 1992 Winter Olympics
Alpine skiers at the 1994 Winter Olympics
Alpine skiers at the 1998 Winter Olympics
Alpine skiers of Centro Sportivo Carabinieri
FIS Alpine Ski World Cup champions
Italian male alpine skiers
Living people
Medalists at the 1988 Winter Olympics
Medalists at the 1992 Winter Olympics
Medalists at the 1994 Winter Olympics
Olympic alpine skiers of Italy
Olympic gold medalists for Italy
Olympic medalists in alpine skiing
Olympic silver medalists for Italy
Recipients of the Olympic Order
Sportspeople from Bologna